The Sun Liberty 34 is a French sailboat that was designed by Daniel Andrieu as a cruiser and first built in 1989.

The Sun Liberty 34 design was developed into the Sun Odyssey 34 in 1991 and the Sun Odyssey 33 in 1992.

Production
The design was built by Jeanneau in France, from 1989 until 1992, with 284 boats built, but it is now out of production.

Design
The Sun Liberty 34 is a recreational keelboat, built predominantly of polyester fiberglass, with wood trim. It has a masthead sloop rig, with a deck-stepped mast, two sets of swept spreaders and aluminum spars with stainless steel wire rigging. The hull has a raked stem, a reverse transom with steps to a swimming platform, an internally mounted spade-type rudder controlled by a wheel and a fixed fin keel or optional shoal-draft keel. It displaces  and carries  of ballast.

The design has sleeping accommodation for six people, with a double "V"-berth in the bow cabin, an "U"-shaped settee and a straight settee in the main cabin and an aft cabin with a double berth on the starboard side. The galley is located on the port side just aft of the companionway ladder. The galley is "L"-shaped and is equipped with a two-burner stove, an ice box and a double sink. A navigation station is forward of the galley, on the port side. There are two heads, one just aft of the bow cabin on the straboard side and one on the starboard side just forward of the aft cabin.

See also
List of sailing boat types

References

External links

Keelboats
1980s sailboat type designs
Sailing yachts
Sailboat type designs by Daniel Andrieu
Sailboat types built by Jeanneau